William "Bill" Cartwright (c. 1923 – June 7, 2012) was a Bahamian politician, realtor and magazine publisher. Cartwright, together with  Sir Henry Milton Taylor and Cyril Stevenson, co-founded the Progressive Liberal Party (PLP) in 1953, the first national political party to be established in the Bahamas. He was the last surviving member of the PLP's three founders.

Cartwright was a native of Long Island, Bahamas. He was elected to the Bahamas House of Assembly, the lower house of Parliament, in 1949 as a representative of Cat Island. He served in parliament for seven years.

In 1953, Cartwright joined with Sir Henry Milton Taylor and Cyril Stevenson to found the Progressive Liberal Party (PLP), the first national political party in the Bahamas. Outside politics Cartwright worked as a realtor before becoming a magazine publisher later in life.

Cartwright resided at the Good Samaritan Home in Nassau for the final two years of his life. He died at Princess Margaret Hospital in Nassau at 4 a.m. on June 7, 2012, at the age of 89. Bahamas Governor-General Arthur Foulkes had visited Cartwright three weeks before his death. Prime Minister of the Bahamas and leader of the PLP, Perry Christie, presented a speech in honor of Cartwright to the Assembly, calling him a "national hero" who contributed a "historical role he had played in laying the foundations for party politics in The Bahamas." Loretta Butler-Turner, the deputy leader of the opposition Free National Movement (FNM) and MP for Cartwright's native Long Island, said that "He is in his own right a founder of the modern Bahamas." Butler-Turner also called for the establishment of a national oral history project following Cartwright's death to preserve the modern, social and national history and national identity of the country.

References

2012 deaths
Progressive Liberal Party politicians
Real estate brokers
Magazine publishers (people)
1920s births
Members of the House of Assembly of the Bahamas
People from Long Island, Bahamas
Bahamian businesspeople